The Edinger–Westphal nucleus (accessory oculomotor nucleus, or visceral oculomotor nucleus) is one of two nuclei of the oculomotor nerve. It is located in the midbrain. It contributes the autonomic parasympathetic (i.e. visceral) component to the oculomotor nerve, providing innervation to the iris sphincter muscle and ciliary muscle to mediate the pupillary light reflex and accommodation, respectively. It is composed of parasympathetic pre-ganglionic cell bodies that synapse in the ciliary ganglion.

The term "Edinger–Westphal nucleus" also referred to what is now known as the centrally-projecting Edinger–Westphal nucleus, intermingled population of non-preganglionic neurons that do not project to the ciliary ganglion but to various regions throughout the central nervous system.

Anatomy

Centrally-projecting Edinger–Westphal nucleus 

Alternatively, the term Edinger–Westphal nucleus is often used to refer to the adjacent population of non-preganglionic neurons that do not project to the ciliary ganglion, but rather project to the spinal cord, dorsal raphe nucleus, lateral septal nuclei, lateral hypothalamic area and the central nucleus of the amygdala, among other regions.

Unlike the classical preganglionic neurons that contain choline acetyltransferase, neurons of the Centrally-projecting Edinger–Westphal nucleus contain various neuropeptide such as urocortin and cocaine- and amphetamine-regulated transcript.

Previously, it had been proposed to rename this group of non-preganglionic, neuropeptide-containing neurons to perioculomotor subgriseal neuronal stream, abbreviated pIIISG. However, more recently, a final nomenclature has been determined. Preganglionic oculomotor neurons within the Edinger–Westphal nucleus are to be referred to as the EWpg, and the neuropeptide-containing neurons shall be known as the centrally-projecting Edinger Westphal nucleus, or EWcp.

Anatomical relations 
The paired nuclei are posterior to the main motor nucleus (oculomotor nucleus) and anterolateral to the cerebral aqueduct in the rostral midbrain at the level of the superior colliculus.

It is the most rostral of the parasympathetic nuclei in the brain stem.

Function
The Edinger–Westphal nucleus supplies preganglionic parasympathetic fibers to the eye, constricting the pupil, accommodating the lens, and convergence of the eyes.

Neurophysiology

Pupillary light reflex 

The EWN receives feedback from the locus coeruleus about illumination of the retina in order for the EWN to adjust the size of the pupil in response to varying ambiental brightness.

Accommodation

Research 
It has also been implicated in the mirroring of pupil size in sad facial expressions. When seeing a sad face, participants' pupils dilated or constricted to mirror the face they saw, which predicted both how sad they perceived the face to be, as well as activity within this region.

Eponym
The nucleus is named for both Ludwig Edinger, from Frankfurt, who demonstrated it in the fetus in 1885, and for Karl Friedrich Otto Westphal, from Berlin, who demonstrated it in the adult in 1887.

Additional images

References

External links
 Diagram at Columbia
 
 
 

Cranial nerve nuclei
Oculomotor nerve
Midbrain